Ming Tak Estate is a public housing estate in Hang Hau, Tseung Kwan O, New Territories, Hong Kong, near Tseung Kwan O Hospital. It is the fifth public housing estate in Tseung Kwan O and comprises 2 blocks of Harmony I style built in 1996.

Hin Ming Court, Yuk Ming Court and Wo Ming Court are Home Ownership Scheme housing courts in Tseung Kwan O near Ming Tak Estate, built between 1996 and 1999.

Houses

Ming Tak Estate

Hin Ming Court

Yuk Ming Court

Wo Ming Court

Demographics
According to the 2016 by-census, Ming Tak Estate had a population of 4,393, Yuk Ming Court had a population of 5,591 while Wo Ming Court had a population of 4,976. Altogether the population amounts to 14,960.

Politics
Ming Tak Estate, Hin Ming Court, Yuk Ming Court and Wo Ming Court are located in Tak Ming constituency of the Sai Kung District Council. It was formerly represented by Cheng Chung-man, who was elected in the 2019 elections until July 2021.

See also

Public housing estates in Tseung Kwan O

References

Residential buildings completed in 1996
Hang Hau
Public housing estates in Hong Kong